Wilkinson County is the name of two counties in the United States:

 Wilkinson County, Georgia
 Wilkinson County, Mississippi